His Majesty's hired armed cutter Nox served the British Royal Navy under contract from 17 April 1798 to 31 October 1801. She was of 109 tons (bm), and carried twelve 12-pounder carronades.

On 23 May 1799 the hired armed cutter Ann captured Aimable Therese, a small French privateer lugger of four guns and 27 men. At the time, Ann was in company with the sloop  and Nox. Nox was under the command of Lieutenant Ulysses Hughes.

In October 1799 Nox was under Hughes' command and stationed in the Downs.

On 3 January 1800 Mr George Buckley, Collector of the Customs at Newhaven, received intelligence of a small, suspicious vessel off the harbour. He gathered  Mr. Bound, Noxs Mate, some of her crew, his own boatmen, Mr. S. Cooper, master of Unity, some men of the coast artillery, and some other volunteers. The motley assemblage manned the Customs House's boat and four others and set out in chase. They caught up with their quarry after about two hours; the French vessel put a short resistance and then struck her colours. The captured vessel proved to be General Brune, of Dieppe, about 30 tons (bm), and armed with two carriage guns (not mounted), and small arms. She had a crew of 15 men under the command of Citizen Fleury.

In July Nox, Lieutenant G. Harris, chased a lugger onshore near Boulogne, where the lugger's crew abandoned her. Heavy fire from a nearby battery prevented Harris and his men from taking or destroying the lugger.

In June 1801 Nox was at Weymouth attending the royal family on their annual visit there. While she was there Lieutenant Thomas Ussher assumed command of her. On 14 September Ussher and Nox captured the Swedish brig Louisa Cbarlotta.

Unfortunately, currently available online sources do not make it possible to identify Noxs origins, or her fate after her service with the navy.

Notes, citations, and references
Notes

Citations

References
 
 
 
 

Hired armed vessels of the Royal Navy
1790s ships